Jody Rosen (born June 21, 1969 in New York City) is an American journalist and author.  He is a contributing writer for The New York Times Magazine.

Career

Journalism
Rosen served as critic-at-large for T: The New York Times Style Magazine, pop music critic for New York, music critic for Slate, before joining the  Times magazine. He has also written for such publications as The New Yorker and Rolling Stone.

Books
Rosen is the author of White Christmas: The Story of an American Song and Two Wheels Good: The History And Mystery Of The Bicycle.

Bibliography
 2022 - Two Wheels Good: The History And Mystery Of The Bicycle; 

 2007 - White Christmas: The Story of an American Song;

References

External links

1969 births
Living people
20th-century American journalists
20th-century American male writers
21st-century American journalists
21st-century American male writers
American male journalists
American music critics
New York (magazine) people
The New York Times Magazine
The New Yorker people
Rolling Stone people
Slate (magazine) people